The Riverside County Sheriff's Department (RSD), also known as the Riverside Sheriff's Office (RSO), is a law enforcement agency in Riverside County, in the U.S. state of California. Overseen by an elected sheriff-coroner, the department serves unincorporated areas of Riverside County as well as some of the incorporated cities in the county by contract (see contract city).  17 of the county's 26 cities, with populations ranging from 4,958 to 193,365, contract with the department for police services.  The county hospital and one tribal community also contract with the department for proactive policing.  Riverside County is home to 12 federally recognized Indian reservations.  Absent proactive policing and traffic enforcement, the department is responsible for enforcing criminal law on all Native American tribal land within the county.  This function is mandated by Public Law 280, enacted in 1953, which transferred the responsibility of criminal law enforcement on tribal land from the federal government to specified state governments including California. The department also operates the county's jail system.

In addition to performing law enforcement and corrections roles, the department performs the functions of the coroner's office and marshal's office. In its coroner function, the department is responsible for recovering deceased persons within the county and conducting autopsies. When California reorganized its judicial system in the early 21st century and eliminated state marshal's offices, the department assumed responsibility for state courts within the county, providing court security and service of warrants and court processes.  The department also provides services such as air support, special weapons teams for high-risk critical incidents, forensics services and crime laboratories, homicide investigations, and academy training to smaller law enforcement agencies within the county and in surrounding counties.

History

Riverside County was created from portions of San Bernardino and San Diego Counties on May 9, 1893. In the early history of the county, the sheriff's office was a one-person operation. As the county grew in population, so too did the department, eventually transforming into a modern full-service law enforcement agency.

The department made national headlines on May 9, 1980, when five men armed with shotguns, an assault rifle, handguns, and an improvised explosive device robbed the Norco branch of Security Pacific Bank. Since dubbed the "Norco shootout", deputies responding to the bank robbery call, armed only with their pistols, confronted the perpetrators outside the bank and a prolonged gun battle and subsequent vehicle pursuit ensued.  The aftermath of the incident left 33 patrol cars damaged or completely destroyed, one sheriff's helicopter shot down, three robbers imprisoned for life, two robbers dead, eight sheriff's deputies wounded, and one deputy killed in the line of duty.

Today the Riverside County Sheriff's Department is responsible for 7,303 square miles, spreading almost 200 miles in length, and embracing approximately 50 miles in width. This territory constitutes the fourth largest county in the state of California and is roughly the size of the state of New Jersey in total area. Vast changes have occurred in Riverside County since its inception. The population, having increased from 13,745 in 1893 to more than 2,189,641 in 2010, ranks it fourth in population among California's counties behind Los Angeles, Orange, and San Diego Counties respectively. Expanding to keep up with the county's explosive growth, the Riverside County Sheriff's Department is now the second-largest sheriff's department and third-largest police agency in California, with a staff of over 3,600.

County jail system
The Riverside County Sheriff's Department operates the county's jail system. The Riverside County jails provide short-term and long-term (depending on the type of sentencing) incarceration services for the county, jailing subjects arrested and charged with various types of crimes pending their court disposition as well as those convicted of crimes and sentenced. Services also include transportation of prisoners if necessary related to court appearances, and transferring prisoners between jurisdictions such as other counties, states, or the California Department of Corrections and Rehabilitation. Jails are staffed by fully sworn deputy sheriffs as well as specialized correctional deputies. The county's jail system consists of the Robert Presley Detention Center (RPDC) in downtown Riverside, the Southwest Detention Center (SWDC) in French Valley near Murrieta, the Larry Smith Correctional Facility (SCF) in Banning, the Indio Jail, and the Blythe Jail.

The Riverside County Jail (RCJ) was renamed RPDC in 1989 with the completion of a new, modern jail facility across the street from the original jail.  The "Old Jail" was originally constructed in 1933 and was built as part of the old historic courthouse annex.  In 1963, an addition was made to the jail, which included dormitory-style housing units, a dispensary, detox cell, segregation cells, visiting area, and business office.  In 1979, the county expanded the female section of the jail. The "Old Jail" was closed in 2011.

The Indio Jail facility is being completely rebuilt, with the old Indio Jail being demolished and turned into a parking lot upon completion of construction. The new Indio Jail will be the largest correctional facility in Riverside County, with the ability to house 1,626 beds. Construction began in March 2014 and is anticipated to be completed at the end of 2016, the facility be fully operational near the end of 2025.

Academy
The Riverside Sheriff's Academy is located at the Ben Clark Public Safety Training Center (BCTC) near the March Air Reserve Base. Sheriff's academy training at BCTC is standardized and certified by the California Commission on Peace Officer Standards and Training (POST). Trainees receive a minimum of 24 weeks of intensive training.  The county's municipal police departments as well as other regional law enforcement agencies utilize the department's academy to train their cadets/trainees as well. Upon successful completion of the academy, graduating Riverside County Deputy Sheriff Trainees also receive additional detention-specific training at the academy if they will be going to a jail posting for their first assignment (regardless of first assignment, all Sheriff's Deputies must eventually go to patrol if they wish to advance in rank/special assignment).

BCTC is also the location of the sheriff's corrections and dispatch academies. In addition, BCTC provides ongoing advanced career training for the department and surrounding agencies.

BCTC is a public safety training center jointly operated by the Riverside County Sheriff's Department and the Riverside County Fire Department in cooperation with the California Department of Forestry and Fire Protection, the California State Fire Marshal, the California Highway Patrol, and Riverside Community College.

Controversies

Horace Roberts case 
A lawsuit alleged that the department framed Horace Roberts for the murder of his girlfriend in 1998. In 2018 Roberts was exonerated by DNA evidence and released. The county paid $11 million to settle the matter.

Undercover High School Stings 
The Riverside Sheriff's Department conducted an undercover sting operation targeting students at Chaparral High School. Operation Glasshouse was granted permission by Superintendent Timothy Ritter. The Riverside Sheriff's Department was accused of ignoring affluent students and choosing targets that belonged to minority groups and the mentally disabled.

Fraudulent Promotion Exams 
An internal investigation by the Riverside County Sheriff's Department revealed that 25 employees cheated on a promotion exam. No employees got fired, and some were promoted.

Anti-government orientation 
In 2021, press reports indicated that Sheriff Bianco was a due-paying member of the far-right anti-government militia the Oath Keepers in 2014. After the 2021 United States Capitol attack, Bianco observed said "the misguided and illegal actions of several individual members of Oath Keepers does not justify the mainstream media and FBI painting the whole group as an “anti-government militia.” He is also a member of the Constitutional Sheriffs and Peace Officers Association. He no longer thinks the senior leaders of the FBI are legitimate.  “I lost faith in the FBI a long time ago. The line workers are first rate. Their administration has no business carrying a badge. They strayed from nonbiased law enforcement a long time ago.”

Contract cities and entities served

Calimesa
Canyon Lake
Coachella
Eastvale
Indian Wells
Jurupa Valley
La Quinta
Lake Elsinore
Moreno Valley
Norco
Palm Desert
Perris
Rancho Mirage
San Jacinto
Temecula
Wildomar
Agua Caliente Tribal Nation
Anza-Borrego Desert State Park
Augustine Tribal Nation
Cabazon Band of Mission Indians
Colorado Indian Tribal Nation
De Luz Community Services District
Morongo Indian Reservation
Mt. San Jacinto College
Pechanga Tribal Nation
Riverside County Regional Medical Center
Santa Rosa Tribal Nation
Soboba Tribal Nation
Southern Coachella Valley Community Services District
Torres Martinez Tribal Nation
Twenty-Nine Palms Tribal Nation

Current and past sheriffs

The sheriff is elected for a position now called " Riverside County Sheriff-Coronor-Public Administrator." The election are nonpartisan. In November 2018, Sheriff Bianco defeated the incumbent, Stan Sniff.

Organizational structure
The following represents the organization of the RCSD:

Bureaus
 Coroner & Courts
 Corrections
 Field Operations
 Support & Administration

Ranking structure and insignias

Divisions
 Administrative Services
 Coroner & Courts
 Corrections
 East Field Operations
 Professional Standards
 Public Information Office
 Special Operations
 Support Services
 West Field Operations

Stations
 Cabazon Station (serves the city of Calimesa, the unincorporated communities of Cabazon, Cherry Valley, Whitewater, and the Morongo Indian Reservation)
 Colorado River Station (serves unincorporated territory outside the city of Blythe)
 Hemet Station (serves the city of San Jacinto, the unincorporated communities of Anza, Aguanga, East Hemet, Cahuilla, Fern Valley, Homeland, Idyllwild, Mountain Center, Nuevo, Pine Cove, Pinyon Pines, Sage, Valle Vista, and Winchester, and Anza Borrego State Park, Mt. San Jacinto Community College, and the Santa Rosa Wilderness)
 Thermal Station (serves the cities of La Quinta and Coachella and the unincorporated areas of Thermal, Mecca, Indio Hills, North Shore, and Bermuda Dunes)
 Jurupa Valley Station (serves the cities of Jurupa Valley, Eastvale, and Norco)
 Lake Elsinore Station (serves the cities of Wildomar, Canyon Lake, and Lake Elsinore)
 Moreno Valley Station (serves the city of Moreno Valley)
 Palm Desert Station (serves the cities of Indian Wells, Rancho Mirage and Palm Desert)
 Perris Station (serves the city of Perris)
 San Jacinto Station (serves the City of San Jacinto and Mount San Jacinto College)
 Southwest Station (serves the city of Temecula and the unincorporated communities of French Valley and De Luz)

Other facilities
 Aviation
 Coroner/Public Administrator
 Ben Clark Training Center
 Dispatch Center
 Sheriff's Administration
 Special Investigations Bureau
 Courts/County Administration Building
 College of the Desert Public Safety Academy

See also

 List of law enforcement agencies in California

References

External links
 Riverside County Sheriff's Department
 Riverside Sheriff's Association 
 Law Enforcement Management Unit
 Ben Clark Training Center
 Riverside Mountain Rescue Unit
 Desert Sheriff's Search and Rescue

Sheriff
Sheriffs' departments of California
Government in Riverside, California
Buildings and structures in Riverside, California
Prisons in Riverside County, California
Organizations based in Riverside County, California
1893 establishments in California